Charles L. Sullivan (August 20, 1924 – April 18, 1979) was an American politician, attorney and military pilot. He served the 24th Lieutenant Governor of Mississippi from 1968 to 1972 under Governor John Bell Williams. He was also a general in the United States Air National Guard.

Early life and education 
Charles L. Sullivan was born on August 20, 1924, in New Orleans and was raised in Greene and Perry counties of Mississippi. His father was a school superintendent. He attended Hintonville High School, Knox College, and Tulane University and before earning a law degree from the University of Mississippi School of Law in 1950. He married Mary Lester Rayner and had four children with her.

Career 
Sullivan was interested in having a political career from a young age. A trial attorney, Sullivan ran for President of the United States in the 1960 presidential election as the candidate of the Constitution Party. He and his running mate, Merritt Curtis, received 18,162 votes in Texas, the only state where he was on the ballot, or 0.79% of the popular vote. In 1963, Sullivan ran for Governor of Mississippi and lost to eventual winner, Lieutenant Governor Paul B. Johnson Jr. Sullivan was a staunch segregationist and modeled his campaign on defending racial segregation in Mississippi as it came under attack by the federal government and local civil rights activists.

Sullivan won statewide political office during a hard-fought campaign during the 1967 elections. As Governor Paul B. Johnson Jr., running for his old spot as Lieutenant Governor of Mississippi, campaigned for law and order, Sullivan and eventual Governor-elect John Bell Williams emphasized their ability to roll back required federal changes to the state's segregation policy as outlined by the Civil Rights Act of 1964 and Voting Rights Act of 1965. Despite thousands of blacks newly registered to vote in Mississippi, the two segregationist candidates for the executive office, Williams and Sullivan, claimed overwhelming victories. Sullivan was sworn-in as Lieutenant Governor on January 15, 1968.

In the next four years of Sullivan's term, he and Williams attempted to mollify whites' angst in response to the school desegregation orders (often called "immediate integration") as ordered by the Federal judiciary in Alexander v. Holmes County Board of Education. Both Sullivan and Williams endorsed white flight from the state's public school system for hastily established private academies that then-U.S. Senator Walter Mondale called "segregation academies". He left office on January 17, 1972.

Sullivan unsuccessfully sought the Democratic nomination for the U.S. Senate in 1978 in a race ultimately won by Republican Thad Cochran.

Death 
Traveling home from Oxford, Mississippi, Sullivan was killed when his plane crashed in a remote area near Clarksdale, Mississippi. He was 54.

References

Works cited

External links

1924 births
1979 deaths
Accidental deaths in Mississippi
People from Clarksdale, Mississippi
Mississippi lawyers
Mississippi National Guard personnel
Candidates in the 1960 United States presidential election
Lieutenant Governors of Mississippi
Victims of aviation accidents or incidents in the United States
Constitution Party (United States, 1952) politicians
20th-century American lawyers
20th-century American politicians